Nabila Mounib (born 14 February 1960) is a Moroccan politician who currently serves as the General Secretary of the Unified Socialist Party (PSU). She is the first woman to be elected head of a Moroccan party.

Early life 
Mounib is the daughter of Ahmed Mounib, a diplomat who served as the Moroccan consul in Oran during the 1970s where she spent part of her childhood, graduating from high school in Algeria in 1977. Her mother, Khadija Belmekki comes from a wealthy family from Fez. She later studied in the University in Rabat and briefly in Montpellier where she obtained a Ph.D. in endocrinology, after which she was a rewarded with a teaching position in the University of Ain Chok Casablanca, where she taught biology (endocrinology) ever since.

Political career 
In 1985, when she was preparing her doctoral thesis in France, she was active in the Youth of Democratic Students, then joined the Organization for Freedom of Information and Expression (OLIE) and the Organization of the popular Democratic Action (OADP) which became, after merger with other formations of the left, the Unified Socialist Party.

Mounib was affiliated with the Socialist Unified Party, under its various names, as early as 2000, but only started actively engaging politically following the 2011 Arab Spring and ensuing protests in Morocco. On 16 January 2012, she was elected, as lone candidate, General Secretary of her party and subsequently became the first Moroccan woman elected to head a political party.

Political actions 
During the constitutional referendum in 2011, she called on her political movement and the Democratic Left Alliance for a boycott, saying that the constitution was not democratic given that it maintains most of the powers in the hands of the sovereign and does not assure a real separation of powers.

Questioned by the Moroccan magazine TelQuel in November 2012, she said that her short-term project is the unification of the left forces into a progressive democratic federalism. In August 2013, amid the outbreak of the Daniel Galván scandal, she was among the first to react by openly criticizing the royal pardon given to Galván, saying that "the decision to grant it [royal grace] to the pedophile Daniel Galván is unacceptable and should be revoked as soon as possible".
During a 2015 political crisis between Morocco and Sweden, which followed a Swedish bill to recognize the Sahrawi Republic, Nabila Mounib chaired a Moroccan delegation in Stockholm, composed of left-wing parties (PSU, PPS, USFP, etc.), between 4 and 7 November 2015, with a view to finding a solution to the crisis. In January 2016, Swedish public television SVT announced that the Swedish government had renounced its plan to recognize the SADR.

References

External links
 
 Parti Socialiste Unifié - PSU | موقع آخر في psu maroc (Official website in French of The Unified Socialist Party)

1960 births
21st-century Moroccan women politicians
21st-century Moroccan politicians
Living people
People from Casablanca
Mohammed V University alumni
University of Montpellier alumni
Academic staff of the University of Hassan II Casablanca
Moroccan secularists
Moroccan feminists